The 2003–04 Israeli Noar Leumit League was the 10th season since its introduction in 1994 as the top-tier football in Israel for teenagers between the ages 18–20.

Maccabi Haifa won the title, whilst Hapoel Be'er Sheva and Gadna Yehuda were relegated.

Final table

External links
Noar Premier League 03-04  One.co.il 

Israeli Noar Premier League seasons
Youth